Mennander is a surname. Notable people with the surname include:

Carl Fredrik Mennander (1712–1786), Swedish Lutheran archbishop
Olli Mennander (1936–2012), Finnish diplomat
Patrik Mennander (born 1976), Finnish singer

See also
Menander (disambiguation)